Federal Correctional Institution, El Reno (FCI El Reno) is a medium-security United States federal prison for male inmates in Oklahoma. It is operated by the Federal Bureau of Prisons (BOP), a division of the United States Department of Justice. The facility has an adjacent satellite camp for minimum-security male offenders.

It has one of two remaining farm facilities in the BOP.

FCI El Reno is located in central Oklahoma, 30 miles west of Oklahoma City.

History

The El Reno Reformatory was originally named the United States Southwestern Reformatory (abbreviated U.S.S.R.) when it opened April 4, 1933, to receive inmates transferred from USP Leavenworth, Kansas; the Federal Reformatory at Chillicothe, Ohio; and the Federal Prison Camp at Fort Riley, Kansas. In 1938, it was renamed the Federal Reformatory, El Reno, Oklahoma. It developed into a Federal Correctional Institution (FCI) for young adults (ages 18 – 26) who needed to be in a medium security facility. In the late 1970s, it began receiving medium-security prisoners of all ages.

FCI El Reno was established to house younger prisoners.
President Barack Obama visited FCI El Reno on July 16, 2015. This was the first time a sitting president has ever visited a federal prison.

Notable incidents
On December 19, 2004, inmate Carlos Brewster escaped from the minimum-security prison camp at FCI El Reno. A fugitive task force led by the US Marshals Service apprehended Brewster three weeks later at a fast-food restaurant in East Los Angeles, California. Brewster was returned to Oklahoma. Additional time was added to the 21-year sentence he was serving for possession with intent to distribute cocaine.

In August 2011, inmate Joe Villarreal escaped from FCI El Reno, where he was serving a 147-month sentence for drug trafficking. He was apprehended in the city of El Reno several hours later. Villarreal was subsequently sentenced to an additional 46 months in prison for the escape and for possessing a shank in the prison prior to his escape.

Brewster and Villarreal were transferred to facilities with higher security levels.

Notable inmates

See also

List of U.S. federal prisons
Federal Bureau of Prisons
Incarceration in the United States

References

Further reading

External links
 Bureau of Prisons - Federal Correctional Institute El Reno

Federal Correctional Institutions in the United States
Prisons in Oklahoma
Buildings and structures in Canadian County, Oklahoma
1933 establishments in Oklahoma